Drofenine is an antimuscarinic antispasmodic drug used for relaxing smooth muscle, thereby treating conditions, such as: dysmenorrhea, and pain in the gastrointestinal tract, biliary passages, and urogenital tract. Drofenine is assumed to work by increasing the levels of the protein TRPV3.

References

Carboxylate esters
Muscarinic antagonists
Diethylamino compounds